George Brooks Veikoso (born 10 May 1970), known professionally as Fiji, is a Fijian musician, vocalist, songwriter, music producer and occasional actor. He was born in Fiji and is from the province of Tailevu. He was raised in Fiji and Hawaii.

Early life
His first professional singing appearance earned him $5 from the audience. He liked singing in the church as a kid. He credits 3 relatives for helping him reach his goals which includes his uncle, Isireli Racule who worked on Elvis Presley's, Drums of the Islands, his other uncle and Fijian jazz star, Sakiusa Bulicokocoko and Paul Stevens. He joined Fijian band Rootstrata in 1987 but left the same year for Hawaii due to the 1987 Fijian coups d'état.

Career
In 1998 he won the Na Hoku Hanohano Award for Male Vocalist of the year and Favorite Entertainer of the year.

He has earned numerous other industry accolades and awards “Favorite Entertainer of the Year” and “People's Choice Award”. FIJI's collaboration on the "Island Warriors" compilation album earned a Grammy-nomination for Best Reggae Album.

Fiji also co-wrote and sang the season 11 theme-song "Let Me Be the One"with Glenn Medeiros for the TV show, Baywatch and he has acted in the 2002, surfer film Blue Crush.

He has produced and released many albums during his career such as “Evolution” and “Born and Raised” to name a few.  One of his all time and most popular songs is “Lia”.

In December 2021, he won the Pacific Music Awards, Manukau Institute of Technology Lifetime Achievement Award for his decades-long contribution to the Polynesian reggae scene.

References

External links

ITunes
Fiji on VEVO
Fiji on Facebook
Fiji on Twitter
Discogs

Living people
People from Hawaii
1973 births
American reggae musicians
Na Hoku Hanohano Award winners
Fijian musicians
I-Taukei Fijian people
Fijian expatriates in the United States